Recher is a surname. Notable people with the surname include:

Charles Recher ( 1950–2017), American installation artist and filmmaker
Dave Recher (born 1942), American football player
Harry Frederick Recher, Australian ornithologist